Syed Osman Ali was a Pakistani banker who served as the seventh Governor of the State Bank of Pakistan.

Previously, he held served as the Federal Secretary in the Ministries of Industries, Commerce of Economic Affairs between 1959 and 1966, Executive Director of the World Bank in Washington between 1968 and 1972, and Pakistan Ambassador to Belgium and Luxembourg from 1966 to 1968.

Osman Ali graduated in Economics and entered the Indian Civil Services in 1934.

References

Governors of the State Bank of Pakistan
Year of birth missing
Year of death missing
Pakistani civil servants
Ambassadors of Pakistan to Belgium
Ambassadors of Pakistan to Luxembourg